The MG VA, or MG 1½-litre as it was originally marketed, is a motor car that was produced by MG between February 1937 and September 1939 and was the smallest of the three sports saloons they produced in the late 1930s, the others being the SA and WA.

The car used a tuned version of the push-rod, overhead valve four-cylinder Morris TPBG type engine that was also fitted to the Wolseley 12/48 and Morris Twelve series III.  The MG version had twin SU carburettors and developed  at 4500 rpm. Drive was to the live rear axle via a four-speed manual gearbox with synchromesh on the top three ratios, though on some early cars it was only on the top two speeds.  19-inch wire wheels were fitted, and the  drum brakes were hydraulically operated using a Lockheed system. In-built hydraulic jacks were standard.  Suspension was by half-elliptic springs all round with a live rear axle and beam front axle.  Luvax shock absorbers were fitted, the rear ones adjustable from the dashboard.

Bodies
The four-door saloon body was made in-house by Morris and had the traditional MG grille flanked by two large chromium-plated headlights. Unlike the SA the front doors did not have separate quarter light windows. The spare wheel was carried on the left front wing, with a second spare on the other side as an option.  Inside there were individual seats in front and a bench seat at the rear, all with leather covering. A fitted radio was an option.

A special version of the car was made for police use and had a 1707 cc engine and calibrated speedometer.

The factory could also supply the car as a Tickford drophead coupé or as a 2-door open four-seater tourer.  The saloon was priced at around GBP325, the four-seater tourer GBP280 and the Tickford coupé GBP351 all prices depending on exact specification. 564 tourers and 591 coupés were made.  A very few chassis, probably only two, went to external coachbuilders.

Production stopped with the outbreak of World War II in 1939. After the war, MG launched the Y-Type to fill the small saloon slot.

References

 Abingdon's One and a Half. Jonathan Wood. The Automobile magazine. August 2001. ISSN 0955-1328
 MG Sportscars. Malcolm Green. CLB International. 1997

External links

VA
Cars introduced in 1937